Ambositra II is a rural municipality in central Madagascar in the Amoron'i Mania region.

It covers the rural villages of the outskirts of the city of Ambositra.
It is the centre of Madagascar's' wood-carving industry.

Infrastructure
It is situated at the RN 7 (Antsirabe - Tulear);

Populated places in Amoron'i Mania